Gvantsa Dolidze (born 1 January 1990) is a Georgian footballer who plays as a midfielder. She has been a member of the Georgia women's national team.

International career
Dolidze capped for Georgia at senior level during the 2011 FIFA Women's World Cup qualification – UEFA Group 3.

References

1990 births
Living people
Women's association football midfielders
Women's footballers from Georgia (country)
Georgia (country) women's international footballers